Pyotr Mikhaylovich Gavrilov (30 June 1900 – 26 January 1979) was a Soviet officer known as the hero of the Defense of Brest Fortress.

Biography 
Pyotr Gavrilov was an ethnic Kryashen and a major in command of the 44th Motor Rifle Regiment of the 42nd Rifle Division.  On 23 July 1941 he was taken captive by the Germans after holding out for 31 days and was held captive until his release after the end of the war in May 1945.

After his release from captivity he was restored to the army in the same rank, but his party membership was not restored due to the loss of his membership card and stay in captivity. He was reassigned as the chief of camp for Japanese prisoners of war in Siberia in 1946–1947. Afterwards, he moved to Krasnodar.

In 1956 he was reunited with his first wife and adopted son, whom he had not seen since the first day of the war. After Sergey Smirnov's book The Brest Fortress («Брестская крепость») was published in 1956, Gavrilov's party membership was reinstated. He was awarded the Order of Lenin and title Hero of the Soviet Union in 1957. From 1968 until his death in 1979 he lived in Krasnodar at the address Svetlaya street, 103 (in 1980 the street was renamed Gavrilova).

He died in Krasnodar on 26 January 1979 and was buried in Brest.

Notes

1900 births
1979 deaths
Heroes of the Soviet Union
Recipients of the Order of Lenin
Soviet prisoners of war
Soviet military personnel of World War II
Tatar people of Russia
World War II prisoners of war held by Germany
Frunze Military Academy alumni